This is a list of fiction set in Geneva — with the city of Geneva and Canton of Geneva, in Switzerland.

(Clicking on the small triangles at the head of a category will sort the list according to this category.)

 01
Culture in Geneva
Culture of Geneva
Geneva-related lists